Hillisburg is an unincorporated community in Johnson Township, Clinton County, Indiana.

History
Hillisburg was laid out in 1874 by John Etherton Hillis (1840-1904), a local businessman and financier, and by 1886 had two general stores, two drug stores, a blacksmith shop, a saw mill, a grist mill and a grain elevator.  In the early 1900s it was also home to the Hillisburg Bank, two churches (Christian and Methodist Episcopalian) and Masonic Lodge #550.

The Hillisburg post office was discontinued in 1992.

Geography

Notable person
 Zerna Sharp, co-author of the Dick and Jane readers

References

Unincorporated communities in Clinton County, Indiana
Unincorporated communities in Indiana
1874 establishments in Indiana
Populated places established in 1874